Aurel Bratu (born 19 July 1973) is a Romanian fencer. He competed in the individual and team épée events at the 1996 Summer Olympics.

References

External links
 

1973 births
Living people
Romanian male fencers
Romanian épée fencers
Olympic fencers of Romania
Fencers at the 1996 Summer Olympics